Papadom is a 2009 Malaysian Malay-language comedy-drama film. It was directed by Afdlin Shauki, who stars in the film. It also stars Liyana Jasmay, Noorkhiriah, and Vanidah Imran.

Cast

Main actors 
 Afdlin Shauki as Saadom, runs a nasi kandar stall with his wife Munirah, still does so after the latter's death
 Noorkhiriah as Munirah, Saadom's late wife, Miasara's late mother
 Liyana Jasmay - Miasara, Saadom's daughter
 Vanidah Imran as Professor Balqis

Supporting actors 
 Farid Kamil as Hisham, plays rugby for the university team
 Scha Alyahya as Shasha, Miasara's rival
 Chelsia Ng as Yvonne, Miasara's best friend since school
 Que Haidar as Mat, Miasara's shy classmate and aspiring film maker
 Harun Salim Bachik as Shukor, Saadom's employer in the university premises
 Adham Malekh as Ali, one of Saadom's business partners.
 Pete Teo as Uncle Lim, one of Saadom's business partners.

Other versions
The film was also remade in the Tamil language in 2011 as Appalam, also directed by Afdlin Shauki.

Awards and nominations

References 

2009 films
Malaysian comedy-drama films
Films directed by Afdlin Shauki
Tayangan Unggul films
Films with screenplays by Afdlin Shauki
Films produced by Gayatri Su-Lin Pillai